King of America is the tenth studio album by British rock singer and songwriter Elvis Costello, credited to "The Costello Show featuring the Attractions and Confederates" in the UK and Europe and to "The Costello Show featuring Elvis Costello" in North America. Released on 21 February 1986, it peaked at No. 11 on the UK album chart and No. 39 on the Billboard 200. In The Village Voices annual Pazz & Jop critics poll for the year's best albums, King of America finished at No. 2, and it was also selected as one of Rolling Stone magazine's top twenty albums of the year. In 2000, it was voted No. 540 in Colin Larkin's All Time Top 1000 Albums.

Released in the United Kingdom as F-Beat ZL 70946, and in the United States as Columbia JC40173, some songs have a country music feel, reflecting Costello's interest in Americana, whilst "American Without Tears" deals with the experience of Irish immigrants in the US and "Little Palaces" references Costello's working-class roots.

Content
During late 1984 and early 1985, Costello undertook a series of solo tours, sharing the bill with musician T-Bone Burnett. Costello and Burnett recorded a single together in early 1985, "The People's Limousine" (credited to 'The Coward Brothers'), and ventured to imagine appropriate backing musicians for Costello's new songs. They booked time at Ocean Way and Sunset Sound studios in Los Angeles, and assembled members of the TCB Band who had backed Elvis Presley in the 1970s (Costello being more familiar with their work on records by Gram Parsons and Emmylou Harris). Other sessions included the jazz bassist Ray Brown and New Orleans drummer Earl Palmer, and a group of musicians dubbed 'the Confederates', featuring T-Bone Wolk, Mickey Curry, and producer Mitchell Froom. Costello's usual backing musicians the Attractions appear on only one track, "Suit of Lights", but returned to record in full his next album Blood & Chocolate.

In the album credits, Costello uses three different pen names for himself: his given name of Declan MacManus; his stage name of Elvis Costello; and the nickname given him by producer Nick Lowe earlier in his career, the Little Hands of Concrete, this being a reference to his habitual breaking of guitar strings during recording sessions.

The version of "Don't Let Me Be Misunderstood", a song first recorded in 1964 by Nina Simone, was released as a single and peaked at No. 33 on the UK singles chart. However, it missed the Billboard Hot 100, as did the follow-up single released only in America: "Lovable". The single by Burnett and Costello as the Coward Brothers did not chart in either nation. Though not released in 1986, "Brilliant Mistake" saw release as a single in 2005.

Release history
The album was released initially on vinyl in 1986, with the Rykodisc Records reissue arriving nine years later on a single compact disc with five bonus tracks, including the Coward Brothers single. Early limited edition pressings also included a six-track bonus disc: Elvis Costello & The Confederates – Live on Broadway, 1986.

In 2005, Rhino Records issued a two-disc, remastered version of the album. The Rykodisc version's five bonus tracks, all six Live on Broadway tracks, and ten additional bonus tracks were all included on the bonus disc. Both the Rhino and Rykodisc editions are no longer available.

The album was issued a third time on CD by Universal Music Group, after its acquisition of Costello's complete catalogue in 2006. This release was a standalone version featuring no bonus tracks, and features the same mastering as the Rhino edition.

Track listing
All tracks written by Declan MacManus (Elvis Costello) except as noted; track timings taken from Rhino 2005 reissue.

1995 bonus tracks
 "The People's Limousine" (The Coward Brothers) (Henry Coward and Howard Coward) – 3:43 IMP single No. 006
 "They'll Never Take Her Love from Me" (The Coward Brothers) (Leon Payne) – 2:55 IMP single No. 006 B-side
 "Suffering Face" – 3:08 demo recording
 "Shoes Without Heels" – 4:20 released as the B-side to "Blue Chair"
 "King of Confidence" – 2:48 session outtake

Live on Broadway, 1986 (limited edition bonus disc)
 "That's How You Got Killed Before" (Dave Bartholomew) – 3:14
 "The Big Light" – 3:08
 "It Tears Me Up" (Dan Penn, Spooner Oldham) – 3:27
 "The Only Daddy That'll Walk the Line" (Ivy J. Bryant) – 2:42
 "Your Mind Is on Vacation" / "Your Funeral and My Trial" (Mose Allison) / (Sonny Boy Williamson) – 5:16
 "That's How You Got Killed Before" (Reprise) (Dave Bartholomew) – 7:00

 Recorded at The Broadway Theatre, New York City, 23 October 1986.

2005 bonus disc
Tracks 1–8 and 13 are solo demo recordings; tracks 15–20 are the Live on Broadway tracks; track 21 is a previously unreleased performance from the Broadway show.

 "Having It All" – 3:57
 "Suffering Face" – 3:08
 "Deportee" – 3:35
 "Indoor Fireworks" – 3:50
 "I Hope You're Happy Now" – 3:06
 "Poisoned Rose" – 4:12
 "I'll Wear It Proudly" – 3:26
 "Jack of All Parades" – 3:32
 "The People's Limousine" (The Coward Brothers) (Coward & Coward) – 3:43 IMP single No. 006
 "They'll Never Take Her Love from Me" (The Coward Brothers) (Payne) – 2:55 IMP single No. 006 B-side
 "King of Confidence" – 2:48 session outtake
 "Shoes Without Heels" – 4:20 released as the B-side to "Blue Chair"
 "End of the Rainbow" (Richard Thompson) – 3:28
 "Betrayal" – 2:25 session outtake with The Attractions
 "That's How You Got Killed Before" (Bartholomew) – 3:14
 "The Big Light" – 3:08
 "It Tears Me Up" (Penn/Oldham) – 3:27
 "The Only Daddy That'll Walk the Line" (Bryant) – 2:42
 "Your Mind Is on Vacation/Your Funeral My Trial" (Allison) / (Williamson) – 5:16
 "That's How You Got Killed Before (Reprise)" (Bartholomew) – 7:00
 "True Love Ways" (Buddy Holly & Norman Petty) – 3:33

Personnel
 Elvis Costello – acoustic guitar, electric guitar, mandolin, lead vocal
 T-Bone Burnett – guitars, backing vocals
 Mitchell Froom – Hammond organ, harpsichord, organ, doctored piano
 Tom "T-Bone" Wolk – electric guitar, piano accordion, electric bass
 Jerry Scheff – string bass, electric bass
 Mickey Curry – brushes, drums, sticks

Additional personnel
 Michael Blair – marimba
 James Burton – electric guitar, dobro, acoustic guitar	
 Tom Canning – piano
 Ralph Carney – saxophone
 Jim Keltner – drums, sticks, brushes
 Earl Palmer – drums, brushes
 Ron Tutt – drums, brushes
 Ray Brown – double bass on "Eisenhower Blues" and "Poisoned Rose"
 David Hidalgo – harmony vocal on "Lovable"
 Jo-El Sonnier – French accordion on "American Without Tears"
 Steve Nieve – piano, Hammond organ on "Jack of All Parades", "Suit of Lights", and "Betrayal"
 Bruce Thomas – electric bass on "Suit of Lights" and "Betrayal"
 Pete Thomas – drums, sticks on "Suit of Lights" and "Betrayal"

References

External links
 

1986 albums
Albums produced by Elvis Costello
Albums produced by T Bone Burnett
Albums recorded at Sunset Sound Recorders
Columbia Records albums
Elvis Costello albums
Hip-O Records albums
Rhino Records albums
Rykodisc albums